The Selfish Giant is an animated short film adaptation of the short story by Oscar Wilde. The story has symbolic religious themes and may be considered a work of allegory in Christian literature. The film was produced in 1971 by the Canadian-based Potterton Productions and by Pyramid Films. It earned a 44th Academy Award nomination in the Animated Short Subject category. One of the film's animators was Micheline Lanctôt. The King's Singers provided the vocals after having formed only a few years before.

The film first aired on Canadian television in November 1972 on CTV. It aired in the United States on CBS on March 28, 1973.

Plot
A giant erects a wall to keep children out of his garden, reaping the consequences of a continuous winter. After months of winter with no other seasons in sight, spring suddenly returns when the children slip into a hole in the wall and play in the trees, except for one corner of winter where a little boy is too small to climb into the tree. The giant's heart melts at the sight and, realizing how selfish he's been, he helps the child into the tree. He then tears down the wall and tells the children it was their garden to play in. Years pass and the giant enjoys playing with the children, but never sees the one special boy he first helped. One day when he had grown old, he again sees the little boy, who appears with wounds in His hands and feet. He has come to escort the giant to His garden, which is paradise.

See also
The Happy Prince (1974 film)
The Selfish Giant (2013 film)

References

External links
 BFI (UK): The Selfish Giant
 
 The Oscar-nominated classic short in its entirety on YouTube

1972 in Canadian television
Canadian animated television films
CTV Television Network original programming
Canadian animated short films
Films based on short fiction
Films based on works by Oscar Wilde
Films about giants
1970s animated short films
Films scored by Ron Goodwin
1970s Canadian films